The 2nd constituency of Loire-Atlantique is a French legislative constituency in the Loire-Atlantique département, covering the eastern part of the city of Nantes. Like the other 576 French constituencies, it elects one MP using the two-round system, with a run-off if no candidate receives over 50% of the vote in the first round.
From 1958 to 1986, the constituency was made up of the cantons of Nantes-5, 6 and 7.
In 1986, this was changed to the cantons of Nantes-2, 3, 4 and 9.  (In 2015, Nantes-9 was abolished and its territory split between Nantes-2 and 7.)

Historic representation

Election results

2022

 
 
 
 
 
 
 
|-
| colspan="8" bgcolor="#E9E9E9"|
|-

2017

2012

2007

 
 
 
 
 
|-
| colspan="8" bgcolor="#E9E9E9"|
|-

2002

 
 
 
 
 
 
|-
| colspan="8" bgcolor="#E9E9E9"|
|-

1997

 
 
 
 
 
 
 
 
|-
| colspan="8" bgcolor="#E9E9E9"|
|-

References and Sources

 Official results of French elections from 1998: 

2